Backhousia oligantha is a rare species of plant in the family Myrtaceae. Mostly found in south eastern Queensland. The small tree has an unusual growth habit, with colonies of many prostrate shoots and many stems from one genotype. At the type location, there are 100 to 200 stems in six clumps, possibly with only six unique individuals. The epithet oligantha is derived from the Greek language, meaning few flowers.

References

oligantha
Trees of Australia
Myrtales of Australia
Flora of Queensland
Plants described in 2002
Endemic flora of Australia